An Hòa is a ward located in Biên Hòa city of Đồng Nai province, Vietnam. It has an area of about 9.2km2 and the population in 2018 was 22,925.

References

Bien Hoa